Andrei Vasilievich Nikolishin (born March 25, 1973) is a Russian former professional ice hockey player who last played for Sokil Kyiv of the Professional Hockey League of Ukraine. Over his National Hockey League career with the Hartford Whalers, Washington Capitals, Chicago Blackhawks and the Colorado Avalanche he played in 628 games, with 93 goals and 280 points.

Playing career
Nikolishin began his professional career with HC Dynamo Moscow. He played for four years domestically in Russia and was named Russian player of the Year in the 1993–94 season. During this time Andrei also captured a gold medal with the CIS in the 1992 World Junior Championships and represented Russia in the 1993 World Championships, 1994 Winter Olympics and the 1994 World Championships.

Nikolishin was drafted in the second round of the 1992 NHL Entry Draft, picked 47th by the Hartford Whalers. He made his NHL debut in the delayed 1994–95 season with the Whalers and following with 51 points in the 1995-96 season. After representing Russia in the 1996 World Cup, Nikolishin started the 1996-97 season with the Whalers but was shortly traded to the Washington Capitals for Curtis Leschyshyn on November 9, 1996.

In the following 1997-98 campaign, Nikolishin established himself as an important checking and special teams player, recording 13 assists in the playoffs helping the Capitals reach the Stanley Cup finals before falling to champions the Detroit Red Wings. After a brief holdout prior to the 1998–99 season, Nikolishin was a main-stay on the checking line for the Capitals over the next four seasons.

After representing Russia in the 2002 Winter Olympics, Nikolishin was traded from the Capitals, along with Chris Simon, to the Chicago Blackhawks for Michael Nylander and a 2003 third round pick (Steve Werner) on November 1, 2002.  Nikolishin played just one season with the Blackhawks before he was again dealt on June 21, 2003, to the Colorado Avalanche prior to the 2003–04 season, his last in the NHL.

Due to the 2004 NHL Lockout, Andrei returned to Russia and signed with HC CSKA Moscow on June 4, 2004. He has since played with Lada Togliatti, Avangard Omsk and SKA St. Petersburg.

On November 5, 2007, Nikolishin was signed by Traktor Chelyabinsk and remained with the team as captain when Traktor joined the newly formed KHL in the 2008–09 season.

Personal
Nikolishin comes from a Ukrainian family. Following the Russian Revolution, the brother of his grandfather went on to serve in the Polish Army, and eventually emigrate the family to Edmonton, Alberta, known for its large Ukrainian Canadian diaspora population.

His father, Vasyl Nikolishin, was a victim of Joseph Stalin's Great Purge, and was exiled from Ukraine to a Gulag forced labor coal mine in Vorkuta, the largest center of the camps in European Russia, for a period of 25 years. His parents did not tell him of this until he was older, out of fear of repressions, jeopardizing his career, and the stigma of being an enemy of the people that would restrict his travel abroad. Upon his death, his father's body was repatriated to Vivnya, Lviv Oblast.

Career statistics

Regular season and playoffs

International

References

External links

1973 births
Living people
Avangard Omsk players
Chicago Blackhawks players
Colorado Avalanche players
Hartford Whalers draft picks
Hartford Whalers players
HC CSKA Moscow players
HC Dynamo Moscow players
HC Lada Togliatti players
Ice hockey players at the 1994 Winter Olympics
Ice hockey players at the 2002 Winter Olympics
Medalists at the 2002 Winter Olympics
Olympic bronze medalists for Russia
Olympic ice hockey players of Russia
Olympic medalists in ice hockey
People from Vorkuta
Portland Pirates players
Russian expatriate sportspeople in Ukraine
Russian ice hockey centres
Ukrainian people of Russian descent
SKA Saint Petersburg players
Sokil Kyiv players
Soviet ice hockey centres
Traktor Chelyabinsk players
Washington Capitals players
Sportspeople from the Komi Republic